is a former Japanese football player. He played for Japan national team.

Club career
Hirasawa was born in Akita Prefecture on March 5, 1949. After graduating from high school, he joined Hitachi in 1967. In 1972, the club won the champions at Japan Soccer League and Emperor's Cup. The club won 1975 Emperor's Cup and 1976 JSL Cup. He retired in 1978. He played 160 games and scored 20 goals in the league.

National team career
On August 4, 1972, Hirasawa debuted for Japan national team against the Philippines. In 1973, he was selected by Japan for the 1974 World Cup qualification. He also played in the 1974 Asian Games. He played 11 games and scored one goal for Japan until 1974.

Club statistics

National team statistics

References

External links
 
 Japan National Football Team Database

1949 births
Living people
Association football people from Akita Prefecture
Japanese footballers
Japan international footballers
Japan Soccer League players
Kashiwa Reysol players
Footballers at the 1974 Asian Games
Association football midfielders
Asian Games competitors for Japan